The Ven. John Hornby Armitstead, MA was Archdeacon of Macclesfield from 1932 until his death in 1941.

Born into an ecclesiastical family in 1868, he was educated at Westminster School and Christ Church, Oxford and ordained in 1892. After a curacy in Sandbach he was the incumbent at Holmes Chapel from 1899 to 1919 when he became Vicar of Sandbach.

He died on 26 October 1941.

Notes

1868 births
People educated at Westminster School, London
Alumni of Christ Church, Oxford
Archdeacons of Macclesfield
1941 deaths